Lakshman Kumar Mahapatra (29 October 1929 – 1 June 2020) was an Indian anthropologist born in Odisha. He graduated in anthropology from the University of Calcutta and received a doctorate from the University of Hamburg. He was Vice-Chancellor of Utkal University in 1986 and Sambalpur University in 1989. While heading the anthropology department at Utkal University, he was the first academic in India to start a course on Southeast Asia in the regular curriculum at the university level in India.

He became the first person from Odisha to receive the highest award for social sciences from the Indian University Grant Commission. Mahapatra served as a consultant to the World Bank from 1985 to 1988 and again from 1995 to 1996 on rehabilitation of displaced populations of India. He served as the director of the Nabakrushna Choudhury Centre for Development Studies in Bhubaneswar, a social science research study centre set up by the Government of Odisha in collaboration with the Indian Council of Social Science Research (ICSSR) from 2003 to 2006. He has been vice president of the Indian National Confederation and Academy of Anthropology, vice president of the Anthropological Association of India, and founder president of the Association for Friendship and Cultural Corporation With Indonesia. He was awarded the gold medal by the Indian Anthropology Society in 2004 for his lifelong contribution to anthropology. He was honoured by the Indian National Confederation and Academy of Anthropology in 2015.

He died in Bhubaneswar on June 1, 2020 at the age of 90.

Life

Childhood 
Mahapatra was born on October 29, 1929 in Nilagiri, a Notified Area Council in Balasore district in the Indian state of Odisha.

Education 
He studied at the Maharaja Krushna Chandra High School in Baripada.

University 
He went to Ravenshaw College for his intermediate studies and later to the University of Calcutta for his BA and MA in Anthropology. He received a PhD magna cum laude from the University of Hamburg in 1960.

Career 
Mahapatra joined the Utkal University in 1964 where he headed the anthropology department from 1967 to 1989. He started teaching about Southeast Asia as a regular course in collaboration with the Department of Geography and History. This was the first time for a course on Southeast Asia to be taught at an Indian university. He also introduced specialities such as "Development Anthropology" and "Demographic Anthropology" at Utkal University which was also the first for an anthropology department in India.

He was appointed as the vice-chancellor of Utkal University in 1986. He was later the vice-chancellor at Sambalpur University from 1889 to 1990. He served as a Consultant to the World Bank for rehabilitation of displaced populations in India during 1985-1988 and later during 1995–96.

Bibliography 
 Folklore of Orissa, National Library of the Netherlands Sudoc [ABES], France Library of Congress/NACO
 Gods, kings and the caste system in India & other essays, Library of Congress/NACO (2013)
 Knowledge for actions: a treatise in anthropology, National Library of France
 People and cultural traditions of Orissa : civilization, society & worldview, NII (Japan)
 Resettlement, impoverishment, and reconstruction in India : development for the deprived, Sudoc [ABES], France Library of Congress/NACO
 Science, culture, and development: Prof. L.K. Mahapatra felicitation volume, NII (Japan) National Library of Israel Library of Congress/NACO
 State, society and religion: cultural historical comparative perspectives of Southeast Asia, Sudoc [ABES], France
 The contours of social welfare, National Library of Israel Library of Congress/NACO (1974)
 Towards rethinking strategy of tribal development, Library of Congress/NACO
 Tribal development in India: myth and reality
 Tribal transformation and cultural integration: India and Odisha

References 

1929 births
2020 deaths
20th-century Indian educators
Indian anthropologists
University of Calcutta alumni
University of Hamburg alumni
Academic staff of Utkal University
People from Balasore district
anthropologist
Scholars from Odisha